Lupulone is an organic chemical compound with the molecular formula C26H38O4 and an appearance of a yellow powder which was historically used in beer brewing. However, recent studies have revealed numerous antibacterial and anti-cancer abilities of lupulone.

History
Since lupulone is found as a component of hops, the history of the compound can be traced back to 736 AD in southern Germany where hops plant were first cultivated. The commercial production of using lupulone in brewing was not until 1079 AD. The reason that lupulone was not utilized in beer brewing earlier on may be due to the fact that the hops plants has a bitter taste. However, brewers began to realize that beta acids of hops provided very little bitterness to the beer. Eventually, hops brewing with the use of lupulone made its way to the United States about 6 centuries later in 1629 after England introduced it.

Synthesis
A synthesis pathway of lupulone involves the alkenylation of 2-acylcyclohexane-1, 3, 5-triones with bromides and liquid ammonia in ether as a base, which yields 4,6,6-trialkenyl derivatives (β-acids)

Lupulones are hops β-acids, which are one the main ingredients of hops resin. Hops are important for beer brewing because they provides the unique bitter taste, smell and foam stability of beer. More importantly, lupulones are a natural alternative to antibiotics for bioethanol production. The problem with lupulone is that it oxidizes easily, resulting in the loss of its antimicrobial activity. Lupulones are very reactive with 1-hydroxyethyl radicals, as shown by the free energy change for an electron-transfer reaction. 1-hydroxyethyl is a major radical species formed during beer brewing. The major products of this reaction were hydroxylated lupulone derivatives and 1-hydroxylethyl radicals. These results suggest that the prenyl side chains of hops β-acids are the reaction centers.

Reactions
Lupolones are very reactive towards the 1-hydroxyethyl radical and are very oxidizable. Oxidation causes decomposition resulting in loss of the lupulone antimicrobial activity. The β-acid is less acidic and water solubule than the isomerized α-acids. The hop acids act as ionophores against Gram-positive bacteria, inhibiting their growth. This activity results from the hydrophobic interactions of prenyl groups present in a α- and β-acid structure with the bacterial cell walls.

Uses
Derived from the cones of the female hop plant, lupulone is otherwise called a β-acid that contributes to the overall bitter flavor and aroma of beer along with α-acids. Both acids of the hops plant are added as the malted barley is boiled in water. This boiling process causes the bitter α-acids to go through thermal isomerization to form the extremely bitter taste of iso-α-acids. The β-acids, in this case lupulone, are oxidized during the boiling process to create products that also influence the taste and aroma of the beer but not as to a great extent as the α-acids. The bitterness of a brew greatly depends on the concentration of the α and β-acids, the amount of hops used and the length of time spent boiling.

Lupulone also has an ability to control bacterial growth and be used in antibiotics. In past studies, lupulone has been shown to be important in controlling the growth of the bacteria Lactobacillus during fermentation as well as an antibiotic alternative in chickens. The antibiotic made from lupulone worked by inhibiting gastrointestinal levels of inoculated pathogenic clostridia within the chicken gastrointestinal tract. Lastly, lupulone has a rising use in antibiotics in the food industry as well as in bioethanol production.

Another use of lupulone is its calming abilities in drugs. Studies show that extracts from the Lupuli strobulus, hops plant, are now being used a phytomedicines in restlessness, sleep disorders and tenseness. The lupulone is combined with herbal drugs and passion flower to be used as sedating drugs.

Lupulone has also been evaluated for anticancer activity against two specific breast cancer cell lines, MCF-7 and MDA-MB 231. Both natural and unnatural lupulone were evaluated. It was confirmed that unnatural lupulone derivatives were efficiently killing cancer cells through apoptosis. However, this process is time-dependent. Lupulone is somewhat challenging to work with since it undergoes aerial oxidation and solvent dependent keto-enol tautomerism. This limits the production of derivatives of lupulone since it is difficult to work with natural lupulone.

In a somewhat similar study, lupulone was tested for its chemopreventive effects on a model of colon cancer. SW620 is a human metastatic colon carcinoma-derived cell line. After 48 hours of being exposed to lupulone, SW260 cell growth was inhibited by 70%. The expression of molecules that induce apoptosis were also up-regulated by lupulones. It was observed that lupulone resulted in an increase in mitochondrial membrane permeability. In an experiment where rats were treated with lupulones in their drinking water, there was a 70-80% reduction in the total number of tumors in the colon of the rats when compared to the control group. Since lupulones induced apoptosis in SW620 colon metastatic cells, it could possibly be a way to treat colon cancer.

References

Phenols